Ale Felege Selam Heruy (1924 – 11 July 2016) was an Ethiopian painter. He founded the Addis Ababa School of Art in 1957, renamed in his honor to Ale School of Fine Arts and Design.

Early life 

Ale Felege was born in Fitche, Selale into a family of distinguished church painters, and taught himself how to draw and paint. He moved to Addis Ababa at an early age. Ale graduated from Technical school in Addis Ababa, and in 1949 the Emperor Haile Selassie granted him a scholarship to study in the United States. He received his BFA degree from the institute of Art in Chicago in 1954.

Career 

After his return in 1954, he joined the Ministry of Education and Fine Arts. In August 1957 under the patronage of the Emperor and with fundraising, he founded the Addis Ababa School of Art where he served as its director until 1975. It was the first formal Art school in Ethiopia.

He served as a committee member of the first annual ‘Ethiopian Students Arts and Crafts Exhibition' from 1958 where he was also a jury member. In his capacity as director he recruited Ethiopian art teachers returning from abroad, such as Gebre Kristos Desta in 1962 and Skunder Boghossian in 1966, both who left marks on Ethiopian art history.

Ale Felege was a member of various art committees such as the Ethiopian Artists Club and the Ethiopian Artists Association, and helped to organize and participate in various art shows in and outside of Ethiopia. He took part in the 1961 exhibition ‘Contemporary Art of Ethiopia’ hosted in Moscow, and he helped organize the 1967 Montreal show.

He was renowned for his landscapes, portraits, and murals. He designed postage stamps, posters and flyers, paintings, illustrations for books and texts, and paintings that adorned churches across Ethiopia (notably the wall paintings in the Holy Trinity Cathedral in Addis Ababa).

In 2006 at age 82 Felege left Ethiopia for Maryland, to decorate an Ethiopian Orthodox Church

Legacy 
Ale Felege Selam Heruy's legacy lies in the history of the school he founded and his role as fervent promoter of Ethiopian art and art education. Ethiopian art history spans centuries, mainly through artisans and craftsmanship. Ale Felege pioneered art education in a school setting in Ethiopia, which in turn has fostered many young talents over the decades and continues to this day.

He died on July 11, 2016. He is survived by a daughter, a son, three grandchildren and one great-granddaughter.

References 

Ethiopian artists
Ethiopian painters
20th-century Ethiopian painters
1924 births
2016 deaths